The Ukrainian National Time Trial Championships is a road cycling competition held since 1997.

Men

Elite

U23

Women

See also
Ukrainian National Road Race Championships
National Road Cycling Championships

Notes

References

National road cycling championships
Recurring sporting events established in 1997
1997 establishments in Ukraine
Cycle races in Ukraine
Time trial